Dato' Sir Onn bin Dato' Jaafar (12 February 1895 – 19 January 1962) was a Malayan politician who served as the 7th Menteri Besar of Johor from 1947 to 1950, then Malaya (now Malaysia). His organized opposition towards the creation of the Malayan Union (by the returning British colonial power after the end of the Japanese occupation of Malaya) led him to form the United Malays National Organisation (UMNO) in 1946; he was UMNO's founder and its first President until his resignation in 1951. He was famously known as the pioneer of organised anti-imperialism and early Malay nationalism within the entire Malaya, which eventually culminated with the Malayan independence from Britain. He was also responsible for the social and economic welfare of the Malays by setting up the Rural Industrial Development Authority (RIDA). 

His son is Hussein Onn, the third and former Prime Minister of Malaysia, his grandson is the senior UMNO politician, Hishammuddin Hussein, and his great-grandson is Onn Hafiz Ghazi, the current Member of the Johor State Legislative Assembly for Layang-Layang and 19th Menteri Besar of Johor.

Early years 
Onn's father was Jaafar Muhammad, the former Chief Minister of Johor. His mother was Roquaiya Hanim (also spelled Rogayah Hanim or Rukiye Hanım; 1864–1904), who came from the Caucasus region of the Ottoman Empire (there are different hypotheses regarding her ethnicity). She was likely presented as a concubine (see Circassian beauties) by the Ottoman court to the sultan of Johor. His mother was married three times and the last time was with his father. As Onn Jaafar's family had close relations with the Johor palace, Sultan Ibrahim treated him as an adopted son. He started his education in a Malay school in Johor Bahru. In 1904, he went to England to attend Aldeburgh Lodge School, a private school in Suffolk, with the then Tunku Mahkota of Johor until 1910. He excelled in sports and captained the school's cricket and football teams.

He returned to Malaya and was enrolled at the Malay College Kuala Kangsar (MCKK) where he studied there for two years from 1910 to 1911. According to biographer Ramlah Adam, one of the main reasons for him to enroll at MCKK was the need to improve his Malay language proficiency that had weakened considerably following his time in England.

After graduating from MCKK, he worked as a trainee clerk at the Johor Government Secretary office and was made a permanent clerk a year later. He served in this capacity in several departments before joining the Johor Military Forces in 1917 with the rank of lieutenant. Two years later, he rejoined the civil service. Soon later, he found himself in trouble with the Johor palace after expressing his unhappiness over the sale of his family's ancestral home. The royal palace did not take the issue kindly and terminated his service in June 1920. He rejoined the service again in 1921 as an Assistant Collector of Land Revenue.

Malay nationalism and politics 
Early Malay nationalism took root in Johor during the 1920s, he became a journalist and wrote articles on the welfare of the Malays. Some of Onn's articles were critical of Sultan Ibrahim's policies, which led to strained personal relations with the Sultan. In particular, Sultan Ibrahim expelled Onn from Johor in 1927 after he published an article in the Sunday Mirror, a Singapore-based English tabloid, which criticised the Sultan's poor treatment of the Johor Military Forces personnel and the welfare of the Orang Asli. He went into exile in Singapore and became the editor of a Malay paper, Warta Malaya, in 1930. Over the next six years, he edited four other newspapers including Lembaga Malaya, Warta Ahad and Lembaga. Onn became very popular after he continued to cover issues on Malay grievances, and Sultan Ibrahim invited Onn to return to Johor in 1936.

Following the Japanese occupation of Malaya in 1941, Onn was drafted into the administrative system and served as a food controller in Johor.

Along with his companions, Haji Anwar bin Abdul Malik, Haji Syed Alwi bin Syed Sheikh al-Hadi and Mohamed Noah Omar, they founded the United Malays National Organisation (UMNO) as a means to rally the Malays against the Malayan Union, which was perceived as threatening Malay privileges and the position of the Malay rulers. Onn took up the role of UMNO's president on 1 May 1946.

Malayan Union
The Malayan Union proposal provided that United Kingdom had full administrative powers over the Malay states except in areas pertaining spiritual and moral authority of the Malay rulers, which the Malays held high esteem over it. Communal tensions between the Malays and Chinese were high, and the prospect of granting citizenship to non-Malays was deemed unacceptable to the Malays. In particular, politicians in Johor were extremely unhappy with the willingness of Sultan Ibrahim to sign the treaties with Harold MacMichael, and voiced out that the Sultan had violated the terms in the Johor state constitution which explicitly forbade any foreign powers to assume legitimate control over the state.
In early February 1946, seven political dissidents led by Awang bin Hassan organised a rally to protest against the Sultan's decision for signing the treaties, and Onn Jaafar, who was then serving as a district officer in Batu Pahat, was invited to attend the rally. The rally was held on 1 February 1946 at the Sultan Abu Bakar State Mosque, and protesters shouted nationalistic slogans and called for the dethronement of Sultan Ibrahim. Malay nationalistic slogans were raised during the rally, many of whom were directed against the Sultan himself, whom they accused him for committing treason against the Malay race by signing the treaties.

News of the rally reached the Sultan Ibrahim on 22 February, who was then residing at Grosvenor House in London. Sultan Ibrahim approached the colonial office and expressed his withdrawal of support for the proposal scheme, but this did not appease the political dissidents and Onn continued to organise more rallies in the other Malay states to muster further support for his calls against the Malayan Union, and formed United Malays National Organisation (UMNO) in May.

To appease the Malays and the UMNO leaders, including Onn himself, Sultan Ibrahim personally donated a lump sum of $5,000 to UMNO and Onn was appointed the Menteri Besar of Johor in 1946.

The establishment of the Federation of Malaya did not go down well with the ethnic Chinese, whereby favourable conditions for obtaining citizenship for the Chinese and other non-Malays were withdrawn. The Malaysian Chinese Association (MCA) was formed in 1949 under the leadership of a Straits Chinese businessman, Tan Cheng Lock who frequently raised grievances over the citizenship terms that were set when the Federation was established. As a result, communal tensions between the Malays and Chinese surfaced, and Onn kept his distance from Tan. Tan encountered initial difficulties with meeting Sultan Ibrahim, who was not accustomed to working with Chinese businessmen.

Sultan Ibrahim also became increasingly disappointed in Onn's work commitment, whom he saw as neglecting state affairs as a result of his commitments towards UMNO. In early 1950, Sultan Ibrahim approached Onn, who was asked to choose between committing his efforts for UMNO and the state. Onn chose to the former, and resigned as the Menteri Besar of Johor in May.

Leaving UMNO
Onn became increasingly disillusioned and disgusted with what he considered to be UMNO's race-based communalist policies, and called for party membership to be opened to all Malayans of all races, and for UMNO to be renamed as the United Malayans National Organisation. When his recommendations went unheeded, he left the party on 26 August 1951, to form the Independence of Malaya Party (IMP). However, the IMP failed to receive sufficient backing from Malayans, and eventually Onn left it to form the Parti Negara, which placed membership restrictions on non-Malays in an attempt to woo the Malays. He finally won the Kuala Terengganu Selatan seat in the Malayan parliament in the 1959 elections under his new party.

Neither party gained popular support against Tunku Abdul Rahman's new Alliance coalition and he was eventually eclipsed in Malayan political life.

Death
Dato' Onn died at the age of 67, on 19 January 1962 at the Officers' Ward, General Hospital, Johor Bahru. He was buried next to his father's grave, Dato' Jaafar Haji Muhammad at the Mahmoodiah Royal Mausoleum in Johor Bahru.

Awards and recognitions

Places named after him
Several places were named after him, including:
 Bandar Dato' Onn, a suburb developed by the Johor Land Berhad in Johor Bahru, Johor
 Bulatan Dato Onn, a small roundabout located next to the Bank Negara Malaysia headquarters
 Jalan Dato Onn, a street in Kuala Lumpur and was previously known as Jalan Brockman or Brockman Road
 Menara Dato' Onn, the UMNO general headquarters in Kuala Lumpur
 Kolej Dato' Onn, a residential college at National University of Malaysia, Bangi, Selangor
 Kolej Dato' Onn Jaafar, a residential college at Universiti Teknologi Malaysia, Skudai, Johor
 Kolej Dato' Onn, a residential college at Universiti Teknologi MARA, Machang, Kelantan 

 SK Dato' Onn Jaafar, One of the component schools within the Sekolah Wawasan in Subang Jaya.

Honours

Honours of Malaysia
  :
 Knight Commander of the Order of the Crown of Johor (DPMJ) – Dato' (1940)
  Second Class of the Royal Family Order of Johor (DK II) (1947)
  :
  Grand Knight of the Order of Cura Si Manja Kini (SPCM) – Dato' Seri (2015)

Foreign Honours
  :
  Honorary Knight Commander of the Order of the British Empire (KBE) – Sir (1953)

In popular culture 
 Portrayed by Nordin|Zaefrul Nordin in the 2007 film 1957: Hati Malaya directed by Shuhaimi Baba.

References

Further reading
 
 Muhammad Faris Izzuwan, Adam, Ramlah binti, Samuri, Abdul Hakim bin & Fadzil, Muslimin bin (2004). Sejarah Tingkatan 3. Dewan Bahasa dan Pustaka. .
 Goh, Cheng Teik (1994). Malaysia: Beyond Communal Politics. Pelanduk Publications. .

1895 births
1962 deaths
People from Johor Bahru
Malaysian people of Circassian descent
Malaysian people of Turkish descent
Malaysian people of Malay descent
Malaysian Muslims
Malaysian political party founders
Presidents of United Malays National Organisation
Chief Ministers of Johor
Johor state executive councillors
Members of the Dewan Rakyat
Second Classes of the Royal Family Order of Johor
Knights Commander of the Order of the Crown of Johor
Honorary Knights Commander of the Order of the British Empire
Politicians awarded knighthoods